This is a list of publicly accessible, motorable passes in the North West Province, South Africa.
See Mountain Passes of South Africa

North West
Mountain passes of North West
Mountain passes of North West